Feels like Ishq is an Indian anthology streaming television series. It premiered on Netflix on 23 July 2021.

The series features six stand-alone episodes directed by: Tahira Kashyap, Ruchir Arun, Danish Aslam, Sachin Kundalkar, Jaydeep Sarkar and Anand Tiwari.

It stars an ensemble cast of Radhika Madan, Amol Parashar, Rohit Saraf, Kajol Chugh, Tanya Maniktala, Mihir Ahuja, Simran Jehani, Sanjeeta Bhattacharya, Saba Azad, Skand Thakur, Zayn Marie Khan, Neeraj Madhav amongst others.

The episodes are light-hearted watch and the idea was to come up with a “sweet love story” with target audience as teens and 20-somethings.

Episodes

Reception 
The series has received mixed reviews with most of the reviewers critiquing the stories to be cloyingly sweet.

Sudevan Praveen from The Hindu wrote "The writers and directors...have sincerely attempted to make their stories sweet. But after binging the shorts, instead of warm and fuzzy, one feels the nausea of overeating desserts"

Lakshana Palat, writing for The Indian Express mentioned "The idea of the anthology is to infuse that warm and fuzzy feeling in the viewer. It is clear that the stories are not meant to be profound, but just quintessentially sweet. Well, if you are up for sugary and cutesy romances, this just might be the show for you. However, too much of it sweetness might be a bit of an overdose.

The Indian Express writer Noor Anand Chawla wrote the following: "The short content format combined with the theme of love stories in modern settings is clearly an attempt to attract a young audience with ever-decreasing attention spans. It is a formula Netflix returns to often, despite its failings. A motley crew of actors, who perform in a mishmash of stories written and directed by people with varying aesthetics and sensibilities, the anthology ends with mixed results—some good, some show promise, while some are downright forgettable".

Saibal Chatterjee from NDTV gave it 3 out of 5 stars stating "the films dwell on tentative, tremulous probing rather than on passion-filled plunges into the unknown. Like the characters they portray, the films feel their way around in search of the sweet spot. They hit the target only occasionally but the misses do no permanent damage.

Arnab Banerjee of Outlook wrote "An exciting film category teeming with potential, this portmanteau depicting different circumstances can be a winner all the way. Consisting of several vignettes, often connected in thematic ways, or with the same premise or bookend situation, this anthology, doesn’t stick to a specific genre. It’s, at times, compelling, packing intense emotions, but also resorts to the tried and tested route".

References

External links 

 
Feels Like Ishq on Netflix

2021 web series debuts
Indian television series
Hindi-language web series
Indian web series
Indian anthology television series
Indian television series distributed by Netflix
Hindi-language Netflix original programming